Cleaning tools include the following:

Acoustic cleaning
Air blaster
Air knife
Besom
Broom
Brush
Building maintenance unit
Camel-hair brush
Carbon dioxide cleaning
Carpet beater
Carpet sweeper
Chamois leather
Cleret
Cyclone dust collector
Dishwasher
Dry-ice blasting
Feather duster
Floor scrubber
Floorcloth
Hataki
Hot water extraction
Ice blasting (cleaning)
Laundroid
Laundry ball
Lint remover
Melamine foam
Microfibre cloth
Mop
Mop bucket cart
NAV- system
Needlegun scaler
Parts washer
Peg wood
Peshtemal
Pigging
Pipe cleaner
Pith wood
Posser
Pressure washing
Propane burnisher
Pumice
Reason washing machine
Scrubber (brush)
Shaker broom vise
Silent butler
Soap shaker
Sonic soot blowers
Sponge (material)
Squeegee
Steam mop
Strigil
Swiffer
Tawashi
Thor washing machine
Tongue cleaner
Turk's head brush
Vacuum cleaner
Vacuum truck
Vapor steam cleaner
Wash rack
Washing machine
Wig wag (washing machines)
Wire brush